A Singles Collection (released as Six of One, Half-Dozen of the Other in the U.S.) is a compilation album of Marillion singles from both the Fish era and the Steve Hogarth era, celebrating the band's ten-year jubilee (taking 1982, when their debut single was released, as the starting point). It includes the band's six most successful singles of the Fish era, plus all six Steve Hogarth singles up to that year. 

The tracks on it are not ordered chronologically, unlike on the later compilations The Best of Both Worlds (1997) and The Best of Marillion (2003) that likewise cover both vocalists' eras. Additionally, it contains two new recordings with Hogarth on vocals, "I Will Walk on Water" and a cover version of the Rare Bird song "Sympathy". This was also released as a single, which peaked at no. 16 in the UK Singles Chart (May 1992), making it the band's highest charting single between 1987 and 2004. In August 1992, "No One Can", a re-packaged version of the August 1991 single from Holidays in Eden, was released as the second single, peaking at no. 26 (original version no. 33).

Track listing

Personnel
Fish – vocals on tracks 2, 4, 6, 8, 10, 12
Steve Hogarth – vocals on tracks 1, 3, 5, 7, 9, 11, 13, 14
Steve Rothery – guitars
Mark Kelly – keyboards
Pete Trewavas – bass
Mick Pointer – drums on track 8
Ian Mosley – drums on tracks 1-7, 9-14

References

1992 compilation albums
Marillion compilation albums